The 2003 ASCAR Season was the 3rd season of United Kingdom-based NASCAR style stock car racing, originally known as ASCAR. From this season 'Days of Thunder' was adopted as a promotional brand inspired by the NASCAR based movie of the same name. It was used alongside the ASCAR brand for the 2003 season before taking over entirely from 2004.

Teams and drivers

Race calendar

The season consisted of eight meetings with either one or two races taking place at each. The grid for the opening race of each meeting was set by a qualifying session with the second race grid being set by the finishing order of the first. Two meetings were held at the EuroSpeedway in Germany with the remaining six at the Rockingham Motor Speedway in the United Kingdom.

Final points standings

External links
 

Stock car racing in the United Kingdom
ASCAR